John Lyles Glenn Jr. (April 2, 1892 – May 2, 1938) was a United States district judge of the United States District Court for the Eastern District of South Carolina and the United States District Court for the Western District of South Carolina.

Education and career

Born in Chester, South Carolina, Glenn received an Artium Baccalaureus degree from Wofford College in 1912 and a Bachelor of Laws from Oxford University in 1918 before serving as a Captain in the United States Army from 1918 to 1919. He was in private practice in Chester from 1919 to 1929, serving also as a member of the South Carolina House of Representatives from 1919 to 1923 and as a solicitor and prosecuting attorney for the Sixth South Carolina Circuit from 1923 to 1929.

Federal judicial service

Glenn was nominated by President Herbert Hoover on April 18, 1929, to the United States District Court for the Eastern District of South Carolina and the United States District Court for the Western District of South Carolina, to a new joint seat authorized by 45 Stat. 1319. He was confirmed by the United States Senate on April 29, 1929, and received his commission the same day. His service terminated on May 2, 1938, due to his death in Chester.

Personal life
Glenn was the father of future U.S. Attorney Terrell L. Glenn Sr. Glenn and his son are the namesakes of the University of South Carolina School of Law mock trial competition. His grandson, Terrell L. Glenn Jr., became an Episcopal priest and an Anglican bishop.

References

Sources
 

1892 births
1938 deaths
Alumni of the University of Oxford
Wofford College alumni
Members of the South Carolina House of Representatives
Judges of the United States District Court for the Western District of South Carolina
Judges of the United States District Court for the Eastern District of South Carolina
United States district court judges appointed by Herbert Hoover
20th-century American judges
United States Army officers
People from Chester, South Carolina